Battey is a surname and may refer to:

C. M. Battey (1873–1926), African-American photographer
Earl Battey (1935–2003), American baseball player
Emily Verdery Battey (1826-1912), American journalist
Evan Battey (born 1998), American basketball player
Richard Battey (1929-2017), U.S. federal judge
Robert Battey (1828-1895), American physician

See also
Battey-Barden House, an historic house in Rhode Island
Batty
Battye
 

English-language surnames
Patronymic surnames